Board and Care is a 1979 American short film directed by Ron Ellis and starring Richard Goss and Laura Jean Ellis. It won an Oscar at the 52nd Academy Awards in 1980 for Best Short Subject.

Premise
Two teenagers with Down syndrome want to have a meaningful relationship, but are soon separated by circumstances and well-intended guardians.

Cast
 Richard Goss as Ricky
 Laura Jean Ellis as Lila
 Luana Anders as Carolyn
 Sunshine Parker as Briggs
 John Frederick Jones as Stanton

References

External links

 Official Site
 Entire film  officially posted by Ron Ellis on Vimeo

1979 films
1979 short films
Down syndrome in film
American short films
Live Action Short Film Academy Award winners
American independent films
1979 independent films
1970s English-language films
1970s American films